Eliana González (born 1 June 1969) is a Peruvian table tennis player. She competed at the 1992 Summer Olympics and the 1996 Summer Olympics.

References

1969 births
Living people
Peruvian female table tennis players
Olympic table tennis players of Peru
Table tennis players at the 1992 Summer Olympics
Table tennis players at the 1996 Summer Olympics
Place of birth missing (living people)
20th-century Peruvian women